Nishat Mazumdar became the first Bangladeshi woman to scale Mount Everest, with the help of three Sherpas - Lakpa Sherpa, Pemba Dorje Sherpa, Mingma Sherpa and a bigger team led by another Bangladeshi mountaineer M. A. Muhit. She reached the northern side of the mountain with the team on 19 May 2012, six days after which internationally acclaimed Bangladeshi mountaineer Wasfia Nazreen reached the summit from Nepal side independently.

Biography 
Mazumdar was born on 5 January 1981, into a family of Majumdars in Ramganj, Noakhali District (now in Lakshmipur District), Bangladesh. Her father, Abdul Mannan Majumdar, was a businessman. Nishat was the second out of the four children of Abdul Mannan Majumdar and Ashura Majumdar. She received both bachelor's and master's degrees in accounting from Dhaka City College. Nishat is married to Rafikul Islam, a software engineer in a software firm.

Climbing 
The path to Everest however, was not simple. It took Nishat almost ten years of preparation before she attempted to climb the Everest. She joined the Bangladesh Mountaineering and Trekking Club (BMTC) in late 2003 and ever since then went on expeditions with the other members of the organisation. She received official training from in 2007 at the Darjeeling Mountaineering Club in India. She climbed the ‘Singu Chuli’ of the Himalayas in 2008, following which, she took part in a number of expeditions. She also took part in the Manaslu peak expedition in 2011.

References

Awards
 Anannya Top Ten Awards (2008)

Living people
Bangladeshi mountain climbers
Bangladeshi summiters of Mount Everest
Female climbers
1981 births
People from Ramganj Upazila
21st-century Bengalis